Long Yan (born 22 September 1973) is a Chinese former synchronized swimmer who competed in the 1996 Summer Olympics.

References

1973 births
Living people
Chinese synchronized swimmers
Olympic synchronized swimmers of China
Synchronized swimmers at the 1996 Summer Olympics
Asian Games medalists in artistic swimming
Artistic swimmers at the 1998 Asian Games
Synchronized swimmers from Hubei
Swimmers from Wuhan
Synchronized swimmers at the 1991 World Aquatics Championships
Asian Games bronze medalists for China
Medalists at the 1998 Asian Games